Players name marked in bold have been capped at full international level.

Group A

Head coach:  Edgar Pereira

Head coach:  Juan José Oré

Group B

Head coach:  Miguel Ángel Tojo

Head coach:  Eduardo Lara

Head coach:  Ronald Marcenaro

South American Under-17 Football Championship squads